A nanoruler is a ruler of tiny proportions, made of a silicon crystal lattice structure. Since it can accurately measure fractions of nanometers, it could help standardize the future nanotechnology industry. Since the characteristics of silicon are well understood, the distance between one crystal lattice line to another is well known. Therefore, counting these lines can reveal a fairly accurate measurement.

The ruler was developed by the National Institute of Standards and Technology, and unveiled in 2005.

Nanoruler also is the name of a machine to produce large (greater than 300 mm x 300 mm) grating patterns with nanometer precision, based on the principle of Scanning Beam Interference Lithography. Instead of the traditional technique to produce gratings through mechanical ruling, this approach rules gratings through the interference of light beams. The Nanoruler was developed in the Space Nanotechnology Laboratory of the Kavli Institute for Astrophysics and Space Research at the Massachusetts Institute of Technology.

References 

Nanotechnology